Maurizio Nannucci (born 1939, in Florence, Italy) is an Italian contemporary artist. Lives and works in Florence and South Baden, Germany. Nannucci's work includes: photography, video, neon installations, sound installation, artist's books, and editions. Since the mid-sixties he is a protagonist of international artistic experimentation in Concrete Poetry and Conceptual Art.

Biography
Maurizio Nannucci was born in Florence on April 20, 1939. After studying at the Academy of Fine Arts in Florence and Berlin, he attended electronic music courses and worked for several years with experimental theater groups, drawing sceneries. In 1968 he founded the Exempla publishing house and the Zona Archives Edizioni in Florence, still playing an intense editorial activity by publishing artist's books and records, multiple copies and other artists' records.

From 1974 to 1985 he was part of the non-profit space Zona in Florence, organizing over two hundred exhibitions and events. In 1981 he created Zona Radio, a radio station dedicated to artists' sound work and experimental music, and in 1998 founded together with Paolo Parisi, Massimo Nannucci, Carlo Guaita, Paolo Masi and Antonio Catelani, Base / Progetti per l'arte, a nonprofit space of artists for other artists. Since the mid-1960s, he explored the relationship between art, language and image, between light-colour and space, creating unprecedented conceptual ideas, characterized by the use of different media: neon, photography, video, sound, editions and artist's books.

From 1967 are the first neon works that bring to his work a more diverse dimension of meaning and a new perception of space. Since then, Nannucci's research has always been focused in an interdisciplinary dialogue between work, architecture and urban landscape, as demonstrated by collaborations with Renzo Piano, Massimiliano Fuksas, Mario Botta, Nicolas Grimshaw and Stephan Braunfels. He has participated several times at the Venice Biennale, Documenta in Kassel and the Biennales of Sao Paulo, Sydney, Istanbul, Valencia, and has exhibited in the most important museums and galleries all over the world.

Among his neon installations in public places and institutions it is worth mentioning: Carpenter Center, Harvard University, Cambridge; Auditorium Parco della Musica, Roma; Bibliothek des Deutschen Bundestages e Altes Museum, Berlino; Kunsthalle, Vienna; Lenbachhaus München; Villa Arson, Nizza; Fondazione Peggy Guggenheim, Venezia; Mamco, Ginevra; Galleria d’arte moderna, Torino; Hubbrücke, Magdeburgo; Galleria degli Uffizi, Firenze; Museum of Fine Arts, Boston; Maxxi, Roma. Several the recent installations of Nannucci in public spaces in Milano: from the large “And what about the truth” at the Triennale (2006) to “No more excuses”, realizes for the Expo 2015 on the façade of the Refettorio Ambrosiano in Piazzale Greco. Recent exhibitions include: “Anni Settanta”, at the Triennale in Milano (2007); “Fuori! Arte e Spazio Urbano 1968/1976”, at the Museo del Novecento (2011); “Ennesima”, at the Triennale (2016); “L’Inarchiviabile” at the FM Centro per l’Arte Contemporanea (2016).

Editorial activities
He founded the publishing houses Exempla (1968), Recorthings (1975), and Zona Archives Edizioni (1976), editing and publishing books, records and multiples on such contemporary artists as Sol LeWitt, John Armleder, James Lee Byars, Robert Filliou, Lawrence Weiner, Ian Hamilton Finlay, Carsten Nicolai, Olivier Mosset, Rirkrit Tiravanija.Richard Long. Franco Vaccari. From 1976 to 1981 he published Mèla Art Magazine.

Exhibitions
1967 Centre Arte Viva, Trieste
1968 Galerij Margaretha de Boevé, Assenede
1973 Galleria Christian Stein, Torino   
1973 Salone Annunciata Milano
1974 Neue Galerie am Landesmuseum Joanneum, Graz 
1974 Galerie Denise René & Hans Meyer, Düsseldorf 
1974 Galeria Schema, Firenze 
1975 Galleria Massimo Minini, Brescia
1975 Ecart, Geneve Galerie 
1976 Galerie Müller-Roth, Stuttgart
1977 Galleria Forma, Genova
1977 Documenta, Kassel
1978 Biennale di Venezia, Venezia
1978 Galerie im Taxispalais, Innsbruck
1979 Galerie Walter Storms, München
1979 Internationaal Cultureel Centrum, Antwerpen
1979 Galerie Sudurgata, Reykjavik
1982 De Vleeshal, Middelburg
1983 Sala d’Arme, Palazzo Vecchio, Firenze
1984 Kunstverein Frankfurt, Frankfurt
1987 Italian Cultural Institute & Art Metropole, Toronto (Snow, Wiener, Nannucci)
1988 Westfälischer Kunstverein, Münster
1989 Gallery Victoria Miro, London
1989 Gallery Graeme Murray, Edinburgh
1989 Elac, Lyon (Mattiacci, Mochetti, Nannucci) 
1990 Gallery Insam Gleicher, Chicago
1991 Gallery Victoria Miro, Firenze
1991 Städtische Galerie im Lenbachhaus, München
1992 Villa delle Rose, Galleria d‘Arte Moderna, Bologna
1992 Villa Arson, Nice
1993 Kasseler Kunstverein, Fridericianum, Kassel
1994 Bibliothèque Nationale de France, Paris
1994 Aarhus Kunstmuseum, (Turrell, Nannucci, Nauman), Aarhus
1995 Wiener Secession, Wien
1997 Galerie Fahnemann, Berlin
1997 Galerie Walter Storms, München
1998 Museum Rupertinum, Salzburg
1999 Cabinet des Estampes, Geneve
2000 Biennale di Venezia Architettura, Venezia
2002 Sprengel Museum, Hannover
2003 Mamco, Musée d’art contemporaine, Genève.
2003 Biennale di Valencia, La Ciudad Ideal, Valencia 
2003 Palazzo Farnese, (Morellet, Nannucci), Ambassade de France, Roma
2004 Pièce Unique, Paris
2005 Galleria Fumagalli, Bergamo	
2005 Bury Art Gallery Museum, Bury / Manchester 
2006 Palazzo della Triennale, Milano    
2007 Galerie Nikolaus Ruzicska, Salzburg
2008 Museum der Moderne Mönchsberg, Salzburg
2009 Villa Medicea La Magia, Quarrata (Pistoia)
2010 Galleria degli Uffizi, Firenze
2012 Musée d’Art Moderne, Saint Etienne  
2012 Dum Umeni / The house of art, Budweis
2013 No more excuses, Stazione Leopolda, Firenze
2013 Galerie Nikolaus Ruzicska, Salzburg
2013 Giacomo Guidi Arte Contemporanea, Roma
2013 Galerie mfc-michèle didier, Paris
2015 Maxxi, Museo Nazionale delle Arti del XXI secolo, Roma
2015 Museion, Bolzano

Museums and public installations 
 Museum of Fine Arts, Boston
 Cnap, Centre National des Arts Plastiques, Paris & Metz
 Kunsthalle Weinhaupt, Ulm
 Carpenter Center, Harvard University, Cambridge
 Bibliothek des Deutschen Bundestages, Berlin
 Bundesministerium Auswärtiges Amt, Berlin
 Altes Museum, Museumsinsel, Berlin
 Städtische Galerie im Lenbachhaus, München
 Europäisches Patentamt, München
 Sprengel Museum, Hannover
 Musée d’Art Contemporain, Lyon
 Mamco, Musée d’Art Moderne et Contemporaine, Genève
 Villa Arson, Nice
 Frac Nord-Pas de Calais, Dunquerke
 Frac Corse, Bastia
 Universität / Università, Bozen / Bolzano
 Centro d’Art Contemporanea Pecci, Prato
 Bank-Building, Edinburgh
 Parco della Musica, Auditorium di Roma
 Aeroporto Fiumicino, Terminal A, Roma
 Galleria d’Arte Moderna, Torino
 Schauwerk, Sindelfingen
 Museion, Bolzano
 Neue Galerie am Joanneum, Graz
 Villa Medicea, La Magia, Quarrata
 Mambo, Museo d’Arte Moderna, Bologna
 Centro de Arte de Salamanca
 Petersbrunnhof, Salzburg
 Muhkka, Museum van Hedendaagse Kunst, Antwerpen
 Bank für Internationalen Zahlungsausgleich, Basel
 Peggy Guggenheim Collection, Venezia
 Van der Heydt Museum, Wuppertal
 Kunstraum Alexander Bürkle, Freiburg
 Muzej Suvremene Umjetnostii, Zagreb
 Museum am Ostwall, Dortmund
 Centre Georges Pompidou, Paris
 Stedelijk Museum, Amsterdam
 Museum of Modern Art, New York
 National Gallery of Canada, Ottawa
 The Sol LeWitt Collection, Chester
 Enssib, Villeurbanne, Lyon
 Museum der Moderne Mönchsberg, Salzburg
 Museum Sztuki, Lòdz
 Fondazione Teseco, Pisa
 Swiss Office Building, Airport Basel / Mulhouse / Freiburg
 Münchener Rück, München & Milano
 Borusan Contemporary, Istanbul
 Zumtobel, Dornbirn
 Bury Art Gallery Museum, Bury
 Museum of Fine Arts, Boston
 Otto Maier Verlag, Ravensburg
 Museo del Novecento, Arengario, Milano
 Viessmann, Information Center, Berlin
 Dresdner Bank, Frankfurt
 Deutsche Flugsicherung, Hannover
 Spreespeicher, Berlin
 Hubbrücke, Kloster Unserer Lieben Frauen, Magdeburg
 Università Bocconi, Milano
 Mart, Museo d’Arte Contemporanea, Rovereto
 Palazzo della Pilotta, Parma
 City Life, Palazzo delle Scintille, Milano
 hypermaremma, Rocca Aldobrandesca, Talamone

Multiples
 whichever word, a neon text in 3 colors: blue, red and yellow. Limited to 7 numbered and signed sets containing the 3 colors. Each neon text measures 8 x 75 x 2,5 cm. Produced and published in 2012 by mfc-michèle didier.

References

Bibliography
Emmett Williams, Anthology of concrete poetry, Something Else Press, New York, 1967.
Achille Bonito Oliva, Fare e pensare, Marcatré  50/55, Roma, 1969
Gillo Dorfles, Maurizio Nannucci, cat. Galleria Vismara, Milano, 1969
Achille Bonito Oliva, Amore mio, cat. Palazzo Ricci, Montepulciano, Centro Di, Firenze, 1970
Giulio Carlo Argan, Maurizio Nannucci, cat. Galerie Keller, München, 1971
Mario Diacono, Introduction to Maurizio Nannucci / Poemi Cromatici, Exempla Editions, Firenze, 1971
Paolo Fossati, L'azione concreta, cat. Villa Olmo, Como, 1971
Jorge Glusberg, Arte de sistemas, cat.  Museo de Arte Moderna, Buenos Aires, 1972
Enrico Crispolti, Volterra 73, cat. Centro Di, Firenze, 1973
Mario Diacono, Luigi Ballerini, Italian Visual Poetry,   cat. Finch Museum College, New York, 1973
Gerhard Johann Lischka, Maurizio Nannucci / Sempre cercando piccole differenze, Der Löwe 8, Bern, 1976
Renato Barilli, Parlare e scrivere, La nuova foglio, Macerata, 1977
Germano Celant, Offmedia, Dedalo libri, Bari, 1977
Germano Celant, The Record as Artwork, cat. The Fort Worth Art Museum, Fort Worth, 1978
Henry Chopin, Poésie sonore internationale, Jean Michel Place, Paris, 1979
Pier Luigi Tazzi, Maurizio Nannucci / To cut a long story short, cat. De Vleeshal, Middelburg, 1982
Bill Furlong, Live to air: artists sound works, cat Tate Gallery, London, 1982
Peter Weiermair, Maurizio Nannucci. Always endeavour to find some interesting variations, cat. Frankfurter Kunstverein, Frankfurt, 1984
Peggy Gale, Snow, Weiner, Nannucci,   cat. Art Metropole, Toronto, 1987
Thierry Raspail, Mattiacci, Mochetti, Nannucci,   cat. Elac, Lyon, 1989
Christian Bernard, Maurizio Nannucci / L'absence de monde est le monde,   cat. Maurizio Nannucci, Villa Arson, Nice, 1992
Gabriele Detterer, Starlight: Nauman, Turrell, Nannucci, cat. Kunstmuseum, Aarhus, 1994
Anne Moeglin-Delcroix, Des livres, des enveloppes et des boîtes in: Maurizio Nannucci,   cat. Bibliothèque Nationale, Paris, 1994
Gabriele Detterer and Maurizio Nannucci, Bookmakers, interview, cat. Biennale of Artists' Books, Limoges, 1995
Pierre Restany, Maurizio Nannucci. Solomon's Seal, Domus, May, Milano, 1995
Georges Didi-Huberman, Didier Semin, L'empreinte, Editions du Centre Pompidou, Paris, 1997
Helmut Friedel & Gabriele Detterer, Light picture / Word picture, Maurizio Nannucci / Where to start from,   cat. Europäisches Patentamt, München, Zona Archives Editions, Firenze, 1999
Markus Brüderlin, Colour to Light, cat. Fondation Beyeler, Basel, Hatje Cantz Verlag, Stuttgart, 2000
Achille Bonito Oliva, Sergio Risaliti, Orizzonti. Belvedere dell'Arte,   cat. Forte Belvedere, Firenze, Skira Editore, Milano, 2003
Marco Meneguzzo, Maurizio Nannucci, Artforum, Summer, New York, 2005
Daniel Soutif, L’art du xxeme siecle, 1939/2002, Editions Citadelle & Manzenod, Paris, 2005
Elio Grazioli, Il collezionismo come voluttà e simulazione, intervista a Maurizio Nannucci, Studio Permanente & A+mbookstore edizioni, Milano, 2006
Achille Bonito Oliva, Enciclopedia della parola / Dialoghi d’artista, 1968/2008, Skira editore, Milano, 2008 
Hans Ulrich Obrist, Senza aver paura di contraddire se stessi, interview, cat. Maurizio Nannucci, Something Happened, Gli Ori. Pistoi, 2009
Alexander Pühringer, Im Licht der wörter, Maurizio Nannucci, Untitled, Herbst, Berlin, 2011
Lorand Hegyi & Gabriele Detterer, Maurizio Nannucci, There is another way of looking at things, Silvana Editoriale, 2012
Anne Moeglin Delcroix, Esthetique du livre d’artiste, Le Mot et le Reste, Paris, 2012
Bartolomeo Pietromarchi, Il neon nell’arte Italiana, interview, in Neon / La materia luminosa dell’arte, Macro, Roma, Quodlibet, Macerata, 2012
Gabriele Detterer, Maurizio Nannucci, Artist-run spaces, Documents, JRP/Ringier, Zurich & Les Presses du rèel, Dijon & Zona Archives, 2012
 Ed Ruscha, Various Small Books, The Mit Press, Cambridge & London, 2013
Hou Hanru, Bartolomeo Pietromarchi, Stefano Chiodi, Maurizio Nannucci / Where to Start from, MAXXI - Museo nazionale delle arti del XXI Secolo / Roma, Mousse Publishing, Milano, 2015
Maurizio Nannucci, ED/MN Editions and Multiples 1967/2016, ViaIndustriae publishing, Foligno, 2016
Bag Book Back. Maurizio Nannucci. Incertain Sens, Dijon, France, Les Presses du réel & le Frac Bretagne, 2013, 104 p.
Where to start from, Maurizio Nannucci, catalogue Maxxi Museum, Mousse, Milan 2015
Top Hundred, Maurizio Nannucci, Museion, Bolzano & Museo Marini, Zona Archives, Firenze 2017
To cut a long story short: writings, interviews, notes, pages, scores, Corraini editore, Mantova & Zona Archives, Firenze
This sense of hopenness / Correspondences, Maurizio Nannucci, Flat edizioni, Torino 2019

External links
http://www.guggenheim-venice.it/inglese/collections/artisti/biografia.php?id_art=178
http://www.maurizionannucci.it/
http://www.mam-st-etienne.fr/index.php?rubrique=403
http://www.zonanonprofitartspace.it/
http://www.baseitaly.org/

1939 births
Living people
Italian conceptual artists